The gray long-tongued bat (Glossophaga leachii) is a species of bat in the family Phyllostomidae. It is found in Costa Rica, El Salvador, Guatemala, Honduras, Mexico, and Nicaragua.

References

Glossophaga
Mammals described in 1844
Taxonomy articles created by Polbot
Taxa named by John Edward Gray
Bats of Central America